Morrissey is an Irish surname. Notable people with the surname include:

In arts and entertainment

Acting
Alan Morrissey, British actor
Betty Morrissey (1908–1944), American film actress
 Bill Morrissey, professional wrestler who performs as Colin Cassady
David Morrissey, actor
Eamon Morrissey (actor), Irish actor 
Neil Morrissey (born 1962), English actor
Will Morrissey, (1887–1957), American vaudevillian producer, lyricist, actor

Literature
Di Morrissey, Australian novelist
Donna Morrissey, Canadian author
Ed Morrissey, conservative American blogger
Kim Morrissey, Canadian poet and playwright
Michael J T Morrissey (born 1942), New Zealand poet and author
Paul Morrissey (comics), comic book editor and writer
Sinéad Morrissey, poet from Northern Ireland

Music
Morrissey (born 1959), English singer-songwriter
Bill Morrissey, American folk singer/songwriter
Chris Morrissey (musician)
Dick Morrissey, British jazz musician

Other arts
Edward Morrissey (director), American film director
Marty Morrissey, commentator with the sports department of Radio Telefís Éireann
Paul Morrissey, American film director
Paul C. Morrissey, comedian
Peter Morrissey, Australian fashion designer
Will Morrissey, (1887–1957), American vaudevillian producer, lyricist, and actor

In government and politics

Ireland
Daniel Morrissey (1895–1981), Irish politician who sat in Dáil Éireann for thirty-five years
John Morrissey (1831–1878), Irish born American boxer and politician
Michael Morrissey (politician) (died 1947), Irish politician; member of Fianna Fáil 
Tom Morrissey (politician), Irish Progressive Democrats politician

United States
Andrew M. Morrissey (1871–1933), Chief Justice of the Nebraska Supreme Court
Ed Morrissey, conservative American blogger
Francis X. Morrissey (1910–2007), Massachusetts judge
Joseph D. Morrissey, an American politician from Virginia
Larry Morrissey, mayor of Rockford, Illinois
Michael W. Morrissey (born 1954), District Attorney of Norfolk County, Massachusetts
Patrick Morrisey (born 1967), 34th Attorney General of West Virginia

Other countries
Alice Morrissey (died in 1912), British Catholic, socialist leader and suffragette
Bobby Morrissey, Canadian politician from Prince Edward Island
Brian Morrissey, co-founder of the Canadian Food Inspection Agency
Edmund Morrissey (1914–1965), member of the Australian Labor Party
Gerry Morrissey, British trade unionist and current General Secretary of BECTU
Joy Morrissey, British Member of Parliament elected 2019

In sport

Baseball
Frank Morrissey (baseball) (1876–1939), pitcher in Major League Baseball in the early twentieth century
John Morrissey (baseball) (1856–1884), American Major League Baseball player
Tom Morrissey (baseball), (1860–1941), American Major League Baseball player

Football/rugby/soccer
Brian Morrissey (rugby player), a former New Zealand rugby union player
George Morrissey (1883–1964), Australian rules footballer
Gordon Morrissey (1894–1970), former Australian rules footballer 
James Morrissey (footballer), former Australian rules footballer
Johnny Morrissey, English footballer
Tom Morrissey (Gaelic footballer)
William Morrissey (born circa 1889), rugby union player representing Australia

Hurling
Dick Morrissey (hurler), Irish hurler
Eamon Morrissey (hurler), former Irish sportsperson
Martin Óg Morrissey, (born 1934), former Irish sportsperson
Paul Morrissey (hurler) (born 1980), Irish hurler
Tom Morrissey (hurler), (born 1996), Irish hurler

Other sports
Frank Morrissey, former American football player and coach
Jim Morrissey (American football), former professional American football player 
Jimmy Morrissey (born 1998), American football player
John Morrissey (1831–1878), Irish born American boxer and politician
Thomas Morrissey (athlete), American long-distance runner
Josh Morrissey, Canadian defenseman
Steven Morrissey (footballer), Jamaican football player
 W. Morrissey (first name William; born 1986), American professional wrestler

In other fields
Andrew Morrissey (1860–1921), Irish-American priest and President of the University of Notre Dame
Edward Morrissey, second ex-husband of Rev. Mary Manin Morrissey
Helena Morrissey, English businesswoman
James Morrissey (PR consultant), PR agent and spokesperson for billionaire Denis O'Brien
Mary Manin Morrissey, New Thought minister from Oregon, US

See also
Énrí Ó Muirgheasa, Irish civil servant

References

Surnames of Irish origin
Anglicised Irish-language surnames